Nasugbu, officially the Municipality of Nasugbu,  is a 1st class municipality in the province of Batangas, Philippines. According to the 2020 census, it has a population of 136,524 people.

Several bus services provide transportation to and from Nasugbu. Jeepneys from Tagaytay also enter and leave the town at a scheduled time. Within the town, tricycles are the main mode of transport.

Etymology
According to legend, a group of Spanish soldiers was allowed by their commander to go on a sightseeing tour of the friendlier villages on the western coast of Batangas. The group came upon a native couple cooking rice in a palayok (clay pot), the lid of which rattled over the steaming rice. In Spanish, the group leader asked the woman: "¿Cómo se llama este pueblo?" ("What is this place called?") The woman, who knew no Spanish, thought that the stranger was asking about her pot of rice. "Nasubo na po iyan, eh, kaya ganyan" ("The rice has started to boil; that is why it is like that,") she replied. The Spaniard repeated the word "nasubo" and nodding his head towards his companions, introduced the word to them. The village henceforth began to be called by that name. Although no historical documents can support this legend, it is the most common story one hears when asking how the town got its name.

Geography
According to the Philippine Statistics Authority, the municipality has a land area of  constituting  of the  total area of Batangas.

Topography

Nasugbu is bounded on the north by the municipalities of Maragondon, Magallanes and Alfonso in the province of Cavite; on the east by the Batangas municipalities of Laurel, Calaca, and Balayan; on the south by the Batangas municipalities of Lian and Tuy; and on the west by the South China Sea.

Entering the town proper via the national highway, one passes fields of sugar cane, corn, and rice fields; hills and mountains. The terrain slopes downwards to the South China Sea. Because of its rolling terrain and coastline location, agriculture (sugarcane, rice, corn, vegetables, coconut, fruits), and aquaculture are Nasugbu's main industries.

Barangays
Nasugbu is politically subdivided into 42 barangays, all classified as rural except for Barangays 3, 5, and 11 in the poblacion.

Climate

The climate of Nasugbu falls under the first type of classification, Type I, characterized by two pronounced seasons: Dry season from November to April and wet season for the rest of the year.

Demographics

In the 2020 census, Nasugbu had a population of 136,524.

Most of the people in Nasugbu are Tagalogs. In recent years, there's been a noticeable increase of Visayans in Barangay Wawa and other barangays. The main language spoken is Tagalog, and a significant number now speaks Cebuano. Due to the historic relevance of the town, a small number of families speak Spanish. Many among the educated class speak English.

A great majority of Nasugbugueños are Catholics. Although there is a legislated separation of church and state in the Philippines, the town fiesta on December 3 is a holiday. Nasugbu is also one of the most important centres of the Roman Catholic Church in the Archdiocese of Lipa. Though officially called Vicariate I, it is sometimes called the Vicariate of San Francisco Xavier in honour of the town's patron saint. Some barangays have their own respective patron saints and celebrate a feast day other than that of Saint Francis Xavier's.

With the growing number of Catholic faithfuls in the town, it has been proposed that Saint Francis Xavier Parish would be divided into two. The proposed new parish is to be called the Parish of San Antonio de Padua and would have its parochial church at barangay Kaylaway. As of today, San Antonio de Padua functions as parish with its own council and ministries.

The minority belong to other minor religions like the indigenous Iglesia ni Cristo; The Church of Jesus Christ of Latter-day Saints (Mormons); Evangelical Christianity; and the UCCP.

Economy 

In Presidential Decree 1520, president Ferdinand Marcos declared some areas of the municipality as a potential tourism area. Since then, Nasugbu has had a tourism industry focused primarily on its beaches. Its proximity to Manila makes it a popular choice.

Some economic highlights are the development of Nasugbu's agro-industrial industry (feed mills, meat processing, and poultry-growing) by building more farm-to-market roads. Hiking in the mountains and virgin forests around Nasugbu is popular. One particular spot, Karakawa, is a series of multi-tiered naturally formed rock pools hewn out of the mountain. The smallest pool is about the size of a Jacuzzi while the biggest measures about 25 square meters. The pools are more than 6 meters deep, and one can catch fish in the pools.

At the moment, because of its rolling terrain and coastline location, agriculture (sugarcane, rice, corn, vegetables, coconut, fruits), and aquaculture are Nasugbu's main industries. It is home to the Central Azucarera Don Pedro, one of the country's largest sugar producers.

Being home to one of the largest sugar milling companies of the country, the production of sweets is a significant portion of the local economy. Nasugbu is the only town in Luzon which hosts a bibingkahan (rice cake area) in its public market. There are at least 10 kinds of rice cakes that are found only in Nasugbu, in addition to the varieties that could be found elsewhere in the country. Many Nasugbugueños, even those who do not do much cooking, take pride in making a variety of sweets such as sweetened yam, sweetened coconut, and similar products.

Cultural and historical significance

There are no historical documents recounting Nasugbu's foundation. The earliest written records of the place are of the founding by the Jesuits of the Parish of St. Francis Xavier in 1852.

Nasugbu did not become an important commercial center due to the proximity of Balayan.

The first historical account of this town relates to when a native tribesman, known only as Matienza, led his fellow Nasugbugueños, together with some natives from the nearby Lian, in revolt against a large land grant to the Roxases. This revolt failed. This happened in the latter part of the 19th century.

Nasugbu was not as much irrigated as the fields of nearby towns, making it one of the towns that suffered much when the town of Lipa was besieged on June 18, 1896. Ten days later the effects for the people of Nasugbu were so dire that the Gobernadorcillo authorised taking 1000 pesos from the treasury of Lipa to provide a rice subsidy for the Nasugbugueños.

When the revolution officially started in Batangas in September 1896, an organised revolt also broke out in the town of Nasugbu, together with the towns of Balayan, Lian, Talisay, and Lemery seven weeks later. The Revolt of Nasugbu was led by Luciano San Miguel and was one of the largest revolts in the province. However, on December 12, 1896, San Miguel unknowingly led his men into a trap, and Nasugbu suffered the greatest number of casualties in the revolution.

In September 1898, the town of Cauit (Cavite) declared independence from Spanish rule. This made the life of the Caviteños more tumultuous than before. Due to this, the people of the nearby town of Alfonso invaded the Roxas estate and started to harass the tenants there. Although the municipal officials of Nasugbu responded quickly and complained to their counterparts in Cavite, the citizens were already defying authority.

During times of war, Batangas was administered by the Governor General and the right of habeas corpus was suspended, resulting in more casualties.

Archeological significance

The Nasugbu Cow 
The Dark Age of Nasugbu was compensated by a great archaeological discovery. According to the National Museum of the Philippines, a group of scientists found a wooden cow a year before the Second World War. Knowing that it was of great significance to the history of the country, the cow was immediately handed over the National Museum, but it did not survive the destruction of the war. However, a year after the war, a new archaeological artifact was excavated in the nearby town of Calatagan, which in turn became the most important prehistoric artifact of the country.

The San Diego Ship Wreck 
Nasugbu's greatest contribution to the archaeological world is the San Diego Ship Wreck, discovered by a group of scientists in 1991 with the cooperation of the governments of France, the United States, and the Philippines.

In his book, Los Succesos de las Islas Filipinas, Fr. Antonio de Morga wrote that being the Admiral of the Islands, he tried to defend the country from Dutch soldiers, who was then under the leadership of Admiral Oliver Van Noort. but since de Morga had very little experience in warfare, he led the San Diego to sink somewhere south of Manila Bay. It was the first ever recorded battle between two European powers in Asian waters.

This eventful sinking of the San Diego happened at the dawn of December 14, 1600. Although the fight resulted in a draw, the news of the sinking reached every main city of the Old World. According to the chronicles, the ship contained so much food and battle gear that there was no room for people that would operate them.

De Morga, however, failed to give the exact location of the wreck. The ship remained sunk in Nasugbu waters for almost 500 years until its 1991 discovery. To date, it remains the country's most important submarine archaeological finding. From it, the National Museum of the Philippines was able to collect about 5000 artifacts representing a time capsule of Asia, Europe, and the Americas.

The artifacts include Asian jars and ceramics from Vietnam and China, weaponry from Japan (like sabres), and Portugal (like cannons and gilded articles believed to come from Iberoamerica. According also to the National Museum, the wreckage contained some of the world's best preserved astrolabes.

The artifacts were also exhibited in France in 1995 and Germany in 1996, returning to Manila for the celebration of the centennial of Philippine independence in 1998. Today, the San Diego collection remains the most extensive collection in the National Museum, occupying a large portion of the building's first floor and the whole second floor.

Nasugbu is the site of the first recorded naval battle between European troops in Southeast Asia — at Fortune Island to the west of the town.

Special tourism zone

On August 3, 2007, by Executive Order 647, President Gloria Macapagal Arroyo declared Nasugbu, known for its white sand beach resorts, a special tourism zone, mandating the formation of a private sector-led "Nasugbu eminent persons group" to oversee development. The Nasugbu Special Tourism Zone will cover areas included in the Nasugbu Tourism Development Plan prepared by the municipal government and validated by the Philippine Tourism Authority (PTA). SM Investments Corp. (SMIC) built a  resort, the Hamilo Coast, at the NSTZ. Also included in the tourism zone are Punta Fuego and Mounts Palay-Palay–Mataas-na-Gulod Protected Landscape where Mount Pico de Loro is located.

Government

In the May 2019 elections, Antonio "Tony" Barcelon won the mayoralty seat. Just like other municipalities, the local government is headed by the mayor, with the vice mayor serving as the deputy and the presiding officer of the eight-seat Nasugbu Municipal Council.

Education
Nasugbu West Central School is the largest elementary school in the Southern Tagalog region. Other elementary schools in the town proper include Lourderette School, Pedagogia, Saint Paul's, RB Cordero Academy and Creative Dreams School. Most barangays have their own grade schools, and some in recent years also have high schools, as in Bilaran and Kaylaway.

Nasugbu Institute, founded in 1932, is a private high school. Nasugbu also hosts the high school campus of the Batangas State University, known locally as the Apolinario R. Apacible School of Fisheries (or simply "Fisheries"). It was formerly a fishery school with courses including Fish Culture, Fish Capture, and Fish Preservation, but was later attached to the Batangas State University. Presently, aside from Fishery courses, the school also offers other courses like Nutrition and Dietetics, Nursing, Education, and Tourism. Other relatively new high schools are Nasugbu Christian Faith Academy, Adelaido A. Bayot Memorial School, and the RB Cordero Academy. Other schools in Nasugbu include Nasugbu East Central School, Nasugbu West Central School, Nicolites Montessori School, Pantalan Elementary School, and Bilaran Elementary School and many others.

The town is home to the Nasugbu Auditorium, where many cultural activities regularly are held. It is the town's primary theatre and showcases not only plays but also concerts of popular artists and bands.

References

External links

[ Philippine Standard Geographic Code]

Municipalities of Batangas
Beaches of the Philippines